"Days Like These" is a song by The Cat Empire. It was released as a promotional single in Australia in 2003 before being released in February 2004 as the second single from the band's debut album and first commercial single in Australia, "Days Like These" peaked at #37 in the singles chart.

The song polled at number 37 in the Triple J Hottest 100, 2003.

Track listing

Charts

References

2004 singles
2003 songs
The Cat Empire songs
EMI Records singles